Calliostoma argentum is a species of sea snail, a marine gastropod mollusk in the family Calliostomatidae.

Description
The height of the shell attains 35 mm.

Distribution
This marine species occurs in the West Indies and in the Caribbean Sea off Mexico at depths between 175 m and 348 m.

References

 Quinn, J. F. Jr. 1992. New species of Calliostoma Swainson, 1840 (Gastropoda: Trochidae), and notes on some poorly known species from the Western Atlantic Ocean. Nautilus 106: 77-114.

External links
 To Biodiversity Heritage Library (1 publication)
 To Encyclopedia of Life
 To USNM Invertebrate Zoology Mollusca Collection
 To USNM Invertebrate Zoology Mollusca Collection
 To World Register of Marine Species
 

argentum
Gastropods described in 1992